John Lawrence Daley (August 26, 1909 in Newton, Massachusetts – February 7, 1963) was an American boxer who competed in the 1928 Summer Olympics.

Amateur career
Daley won the National AAU bantamweight title in 1928.  Later that year Daley won the silver medal in the bantamweight class in the 1928 Olympics after losing the final to Vittorio Tamagnini of Italy.

Olympic record
John Daley competed for the United States in the 1928 Amsterdam Olympic boxing tournament.  He competed in the bantamweight division.  Here is his record from that tournament:

 Round of 32: defeated Ingvald Bjerke (Norway) on points
 Round of 16: defeated Osvaldo Sanchez (Chile) on points
 Quarterfinal: defeated Janos Szeles (Hungary) on points
 Semifinal: defeated Harry Isaacs (South Africa) on points
 Final: lost to Vittorio Tamagnini (Italy) on points (was awarded the silver medal)

References

External links
 
 

1909 births
1963 deaths
Sportspeople from Newton, Massachusetts
Boxers from Massachusetts
Bantamweight boxers
Boxers at the 1928 Summer Olympics
Olympic boxers of the United States
Olympic silver medalists for the United States in boxing
Place of birth missing
American male boxers
Medalists at the 1928 Summer Olympics